During the 2001–02 season, FC Bayern Munich failed to defend either the league or Champions League titles won in the previous season, finishing third in Bundesliga and losing out to eventual champions Real Madrid in the quarter-final of the latter competition. Its reaction to the losses was signing Michael Ballack and Zé Roberto from Champions League finalists Bayer Leverkusen, as well as Sebastian Deisler form Hertha BSC, with the midfield being singled out as the key area in which the side needed to improve upon.

Squad

Results

Bundesliga

League results

DFB-Pokal

Champions League

Group stage results

1st Group Stage

2nd Group Stage

Knockout stage

Quarter-finals

DFB-Ligapokal

Intercontinental Cup

UEFA Super Cup

Team statistics

Squad statistics

Squad, appearances and goals

Minutes played

Bookings

Suspensions

Transfers

In
First Team

Out

References

FC Bayern Munich seasons
Bayern Munich